Ulnar recurrent artery can refer to:
 Anterior ulnar recurrent artery (ramus anterior arteriae recurrentis ulnaris)
 Posterior ulnar recurrent artery (ramus posterior arteriae recurrentis ulnaris)